The 1989 Hong Kong Urban Council and Regional Council elections were the municipal elections held on 9 March 1989 for the elected seats of the Urban Council and Regional Council respectively.

Overview
15 seats in the Urban Council was the directly elected by the general residents and ten seats were elected by the Hong Kong Island and Kowloon District Boards members and fifteen appointed by the Governor. For the Regional Council, twelve seats were directly elected and 9 seats were elected by the New Territories District Boards members, with twelve appointed members and three ex officio members of the Chairman and two vice chairmen of the Heung Yee Kuk. The first-past-the-post voting system was used.

A total of 213,352 voters, 17.6% of the total electorates cast their votes, in which 105,826 voters (14.2%) voted in the Urban Council, 9% lower than the last election, and 107,526 voters (23.9%) voted in the Regional Council, about 10% lower than the last election. 7 of the total of 53 candidates were elected without uncontestedly. Secretary for Constitutional Affairs Michael Suen Ming-yeung expressed his disappointment with the low turnout, explained that the uncontested and less candidates were the factor.

Among 19 contesting incumbents only Fok Pui-yee failed to be re-elected. Albert Chan Wai-yip, supported by pro-democrat heavyweights Martin Lee Chu-ming and Szeto Wah helped him to canvass votes in Tsuen Wan. Szeto Wah's presence in Luk Yeung Sun Chuen helped attracting votes where many teachers living there. Yeung Fuk-kwong, Chan's opponent cited that the loss of votes from his voter base Shek Wai Kok Estate led to his defeat.

General results

|-
!style="background-color:#E9E9E9;text-align:center;" colspan=2 rowspan=2|Political affiliation 
!style="background-color:#E9E9E9;text-align:center;" colspan=3 |Urban Council
!style="background-color:#E9E9E9;text-align:center;" colspan=3 |Regional Council
!style="background-color:#E9E9E9;text-align:center;" colspan=3 |Total
|-
! style="background-color:#E9E9E9;text-align:center;" |Popularvotes
! style="background-color:#E9E9E9;text-align:center;" |Standing
! style="background-color:#E9E9E9;text-align:center;" |Elected
! style="background-color:#E9E9E9;text-align:center;" |Popularvotes
! style="background-color:#E9E9E9;text-align:center;" |Standing
! style="background-color:#E9E9E9;text-align:center;" |Elected
! style="background-color:#E9E9E9;text-align:center;" |Popularvotes
! style="background-color:#E9E9E9;text-align:center;" |%
! style="background-color:#E9E9E9;text-align:center;" |Totalseatsgained
|-
|style="background-color:" |
| style="text-align:left;" |Hong Kong Association for Democracy and People's Livelihood || 12,237 || 2 || 2 || 9,006 || 2 || 2 || 21,243 || 9.99 || 4
|-
|style="background-color:" |
| style="text-align:left;" |Hong Kong Civic Association || 15,270 ||6 || 4 || - || - || - || 15,270 || 7.18	|| 4
|-
|style="background-color:" |
| style="text-align:left;" |Hong Kong Affairs Society || 11,787 || 3 || 2 || 6,912 || 1 || 1 || 18,699 || 8.80 || 3
|-
|style="background-color:" |
| style="text-align:left;" |Meeting Point || - || -	|| - || 21,702 || 4 || 2 || 21,702 ||10.21 || 2
|-
|style="background-color:" |
| style="text-align:left;" | Progressive Hong Kong Society || 7,630 || 3 || 1 || 12,449 || 2 || 1 || 20,079 || 9.44 || 2
|-
|style="background-color:" |
| style="text-align:left;" | Reform Club of Hong Kong || 13,404 || 2 || 2 || - || - || - || 13,404 || 6.31 || 2
|-
|style="background-color:#000000" |
| style="text-align:left;" |New Territories West Residents Association || - || - || - || 8,310 || 1 || 1 || 8,310 || 3.91 || 1
|-
|style="background-color:" |
| style="text-align:left;" |Hong Kong People's Council on Public Housing Policy || 7,187 || 1 || 1 || - || - ||	- || 7,187 || 3.38 || 1
|-
|style="background-color:" |
| style="text-align:left;" |Individuals and others || 37,556 || 13 || 3 || 49,139 || 13 || 5 || 86,695 || 40.78 || 8
|-
|style="text-align:left;background-color:#E9E9E9" colspan="2"|Total (turnout: 17.6%)
|style="text-align:right;background-color:#E9E9E9"|105,071
|style="text-align:right;background-color:#E9E9E9"|30
|style="text-align:right;background-color:#E9E9E9"|15
|style="text-align:right;background-color:#E9E9E9"|107,518
|style="text-align:right;background-color:#E9E9E9"|23
|style="text-align:right;background-color:#E9E9E9"|12
|style="text-align:right;background-color:#E9E9E9"|212,589
|style="text-align:right;background-color:#E9E9E9"|100.00
|style="text-align:right;background-color:#E9E9E9"|27
|}

Elected members

Urban Council

Regional Council

References

Hong Kong
Municipal elections
Urban and Regional
1989 elections in British Overseas Territories
Hong Kong municipal elections